Dead Christ Supported by Two Angels is a painting by Italian Renaissance painter Giovanni Bellini, created around 1460. It is housed in the Museo Correr in Venice.

The panel is one of Bellini's earliest Pietà compositions, together with those in the Accademia Carrara of Bergamo and in the Museo Poldi Pezzoli of Milan. The date in the sepulchre's edge (1499) is apocriphal, such as Albrecht Dürer's monogram.

References

1460s paintings
Paintings by Giovanni Bellini
Collections of the Museo Correr
Paintings depicting Jesus
Angels in art